Fazl Ahmad Khan (1857 – 30 November 1907), also known as Huzur Maharaj, and commonly with the honorific "Maulana", was an Indian Sufi teacher who was considered to be a saint by his followers.

See also
List of Sufi saints

References

External links
 http://www.harnarayan-saxena.org/huzur-maharaj-.html

Indian Sufi saints
1857 births
1907 deaths